Shin Jae-ha (born April 2, 1993) is a South Korean actor.

Personal life

Military service 
Shin enlisted in the mandatory military service on November 24, 2020, and he was discharged on May 23, 2022 without returning to his unit in accordance with the Korean Republican Army's policy to prevent COVID-19.

Filmography

Film

Television series

Web series

Television show

Music video

Awards and nominations

References

External links
 Shin Jae-ha at In Next Trend 
 
 
 

1993 births
Living people
South Korean male television actors
South Korean male film actors
South Korean male web series actors
Hanlim Multi Art School alumni
Dankook University alumni
21st-century South Korean male actors